Schonsee is a new neighbourhood in north east Edmonton, Alberta, Canada. It is bounded on the south by 167 Avenue, on the east by 66 Street, and on the west by 82 Street.  To the north is an undeveloped rural area of Edmonton.

As of October 27, 2007, the City of Edmonton map utility contained virtually no data on this area.  As this area develops, more data should become available.

Demographics 

Surrounding neighbourhoods

References 

Neighbourhoods in Edmonton